Tarkastad is a Karoo semi-urban settlement situated on the banks Tarka River in the Eastern Cape province of South Africa. Tarkastad is on a plain to the north of the Winterberg mountain range on the R61 between Cradock and Komani and only three hours from Gqeberha. The name Tarkastad is believed to come from the Khoi-Khoi word Traka (meaning women) or the Celtic word Tarka (meaning otter) and the Afrikaans word Stad (meaning city). The fact that the town is overlooked by Martha and Mary; two peaks which look like two women resting after a hard day's work, also lends to the name.

History

The first people to occupy the area around Tarkastad were the San who left an abundance of rock art paintings in Grootvlei just north of the town. The first farmers settled in Tarkastad in 1795 who built watermills, inns and both a Dutch Reformed and Presbyterian Church. Two Great Trek leaders, Andries Potgieter and Piet Retief, farmed here for a short while. After the Dutch farmers decided to accompany their leaders on the Great Trek, the English 1820 settlers moved in, and in 1862 Tarkastad was established as a church centre and became a municipality in 1864. Elands River Poort, a mountain pass located on the Karoo, 24 km to the NNW of Tarkastad, where the Battle of Elands River (1901) was fought during the Second Boer War. The grave of Lt. Sheridan, cousin of Winston Churchill, who was killed in the Battle of Elands River can be found on the Modderfontein farm just outside Tarkastad.
Victorian cast iron lamp posts, old water mills and broekie lace adornments indicate the British colonial influence.

Tarkastad's first Municipal Manager after apartheid was Mr Smilo Dayi an ex-political prisoner. The first mayor after apartheid was Mr Ntsikelelo Sampempe.

A family house in Tarkastad was the birthplace of anti-Apartheid activist and African nationalist, Steve Biko.

Climate

Scientists have stated that Tarkastad has one of the healthiest climates in the world. Winters are cold with frequent snowfalls on high lying mountain tops, while summers are hot and dry. Tarkastad which is situated at an elevation of 1,304 metres normally receives about 335mm of rain per year, with most rainfall occurring mainly during summer.

Economy

Surrounded by commercial farms, which specialize in crop, animal farming (Merino sheep, goats and cattle) and game farming, Tarkastad caters for the surrounding villages in Ntabethemba such as Tentergate, Khwezi and Khayalethu. Although no longer the capital of the Tsolwana Local Municipality which has been absorbed into the Enoch Mgijima Local Municipality, the town still offers public and administrative services for surrounding villages.

Landmarks

 Tarkastad rock engravings in Grootvlei
 Tarkastad War Memorial
 Blanco Guest Farm-A game farming outside of Tarkastad
 Presbyterian Church (1881)
 Dutch Reformed Church (1880)
 Thrift Dam

Demographics

The following statistics describing Tarkastad are from the 2011 census.

 Area: 
 Population: 1604 : 
 Households: 499:

Nearby villages and towns
 Tentergate
 Khwezi
 Khayalethu
 Tsolwana Nature Reserve
 Cradock
 Zola
 Thornhill
 Queenstown, now officially named "Komani"

Notable people
 Steve Biko (1946–1977), South African anti-Apartheid activist

References

External links
Military History Journal Vol 13 No 1 - Modderfontein
Old Map

See also
 Tsolwana Nature Reserve
 Queenstown

Populated places in the Enoch Mgijima Local Municipality
Populated places established in 1862
1862 establishments in the Cape Colony